Avenor can refer to:
Avenor Ewe, a sub-tribe of the Ewe people of Ghana
Canadian International Paper Company, at one time called Avenor Inc.
Avener, an officer of the stables under the Master of the Horse